Wolfram Waibel (born 1 July 1947 in Hohenems, Vorarlberg) is a former Olympic Austrian sports shooter. He competed in five different Olympics.

See also
 List of athletes with the most appearances at Olympic Games

References

1947 births
Living people
Austrian male sport shooters
Olympic shooters of Austria
Shooters at the 1968 Summer Olympics
Shooters at the 1972 Summer Olympics
Shooters at the 1976 Summer Olympics
Shooters at the 1980 Summer Olympics
Shooters at the 1992 Summer Olympics
20th-century Austrian people